Harrison High School may refer to:

in the United States (by state)
Harrison High School (Harrison, Arkansas), listed on the National Register of Historic Places
Harrison High School (Colorado Springs) — Colorado Springs, Colorado
Harrison High School (West Point, Georgia), high school for African Americans
Harrison High School (Kennesaw, Georgia) — Kennesaw, Georgia
Harrison Technical High School, Former High school – in Chicago, Illinois
William Henry Harrison High School (Evansville, Indiana) — Evansville, Indiana
North Harrison High School (Indiana) — Ramsey, Indiana
William Henry Harrison High School (West Lafayette, Indiana) — West Lafayette, Indiana
West Harrison High School — Mondamin, Iowa
Harrison County High School — Cynthiana, Kentucky
Harrison High School (Michigan) — Farmington Hills, Michigan
Harrison Community High School — Harrison, Michigan
Harrison Central High School — Lyman, Mississippi
Harrison Central High School — Gulfport, Mississippi
North Harrison High School (Missouri) — Eagleville, Missouri
South Harrison High School (Missouri) — Bethany, Missouri
Harrison High School (Montana) — Harrison, Montana
Harrison High School (New Jersey) — Harrison, New Jersey
Harrison High School (New York) — Harrison, New York
Harrison Central High School — Cadiz, Ohio
William Henry Harrison High School (Ohio) — Harrison, Ohio
South Harrison High School (West Virginia) — Lost Creek, West Virginia

See also
Harrison School (disambiguation)